Börse Stuttgart (SWB) is a stock exchange in Germany, the second largest in the country and the ninth largest in Europe.

Structure of Börse Stuttgart Group
 Börse Stuttgart Holding GmbH
 Baden-Wuerttembergische Wertpapierboerse GmbH
 Baden-Wuerttembergische Wertpapierboerse e.V.

History
Börse Stuttgart came into existence on 4 February 1860, when a group of people from different industries decided to meet regularly. The first such meeting occurred on 12 March 1860. After changing location several times, the exchange is now located in Carl Eugen Bau.

In 2005, Börse Stuttgart, in cooperation with ZertifikateJournal-Unternehmensgruppe, launched S-BOX, a collection of differently themed indices.

Since late 2007, Börse Stuttgart holds an 82.4 percent stake in EUWAX AG. In November 2008, Börse Stuttgart Holding GmbH acquired Nordic Growth Market NGM AB, the second largest stock exchange in Sweden. T.I.Q.S. GmbH & Co. KG, a joint venture of Börse Stuttgart AG and EUWAX AG developed the T.I.Q.S. (Trading, Information and Quote System), an OTC trading platform. In 2010, the bourse started Bondm, a trading segment for SME bonds. In 2017, the Stuttgart Stock Exchange took over the majority of the shares at BX Swiss AG. The takeover was completed in 2018. Since then, BX Swiss has been a 100%daughter of Stuttgart GmbH stock exchange.

Boerse Stuttgart Digital Exchange (BSDEX) 
Boerse Stuttgart Digital Exchange (BSDEX) is Germany's first regulated trading venue for cryptocurrencies. It was launched in December 2019 and the four cryptocurrencies Bitcoin, Ethereum, Litecoin and Ripple can now be traded there. The multilateral trading system of the BSDEX meets the regulatory requirements according to Section 2 (12) KWG. EUWAX AG, which was commissioned to increase liquidity, is also a regulated financial service provider. The partner financial service provider is the Solarisbank.

BISON app 
In January 2019, Boerse Stuttgart released the smartphone app Bison (own spelling: BISON), the first crypto trading app backed by a traditional stock exchange. The app was developed by Sowa Labs. Users of the app buy and sell cryptocurrencies Bitcoin (BTC), Bitcoin Cash (BCH), Chainlink (LINK), Ethereum (ETH), Litecoin (LTC), Ripple (XRP) or Uniswap (UNI) with Euwax, which acts as a broker. The cryptocurrencies are kept by blocknox GmbH. Euwax, Sowa Labs and blocknox are subsidiaries of Boerse Stuttgart. In spring 2021, around 400,000 users were registered with Bison, which triggered a trading volume of two billion euros up to that point.

References

Further reading

External links
 Homepage of Börse Stuttgart

Financial services companies established in 1860
Stock exchanges in Germany
Digital currency exchanges
Bitcoin exchanges
19th-century establishments in Württemberg
German companies established in 1860